is a Japanese ice hockey player for Toyota Cygnus and the Japanese national team.

She represented Japan at the 2019 IIHF Women's World Championship.

References

External links

1998 births
Living people
Japanese women's ice hockey forwards
Sportspeople from Hokkaido
Competitors at the 2019 Winter Universiade
Universiade medalists in ice hockey
Universiade bronze medalists for Japan
Ice hockey players at the 2022 Winter Olympics
Olympic ice hockey players of Japan